The UBA Pro Basketball League season  is the 3rd season of the UBA Pro Basketball League. The Phase-1 of the season began on 28 February 2016 at the Shree Shiv Chhatrapati Sports Complex, Pune.

UBA has partnered with Emmy Award winning broadcaster Paul Crane who has covered sports at the highest levels in the United States for over three decades, to present the Pro Basketball League 2016. Steve Graham, executive producer of the League, has been involved with six past Olympic Games, international triathlons, auto racing and international volleyball games in his career.

Bollywood actor Suniel Shetty and BJP MP and President of the Maharashtra State Basketball Association Poonam Mahajan were the chief guests of the opening ceremony that held on 18 February 2016 at the Pune’s Balewadi Stadium. Basketball Federation of India is extended its support to this event, and former international player, Norman Isaac of BFI.

Delhi Capitals were crowned champions of Season 2 after beating defending champions Chennai Slam by 2-1 in the best-of-three final series. Vinay Kaushik was named MVP.

Format
The UBA schedule has each of its teams playing an equal number of regular season games with their won-loss records used to qualify for the league’s post-season. Each team will play each of its division opponents four times along with one cross division opponent, which will rotate each season. Each division will stage a one game play-in between its second and third place teams with the winner to face the first place team in a best-of-three semi final followed by a best-of-three final between the division winners to determine the UBA Champion.

Teams
There are currently 8 franchise teams competing in the tournament divided into two divisions:

North Division

South Division

Standings

North Division

South Division

Brackets

Note: 
1: Play-offs will be One-game playoff.
2: Semi-finals and Finals will be best of three games.

Play-offs
Mumbai Challengers and Pune Peshwas through to semi-finals.

Semi-finals

Championship

References

External links
 Official website

UBA Pro Basketball League
India